CBCK may refer to:
 Catholic Bishops' Conference of Korea
 CBCK (radio station), a radio station associated with CBO-FM